Jānis Gailītis (born 23 April 1985) is a Latvian former professional basketball player and professional basketball coach, who is currently a head coach for VEF Rīga, and an assistant for Luca Banchi in Latvian National Team.

Career
From 2002 till 2011 Gailītis was a professional basketball player. He played for such teams as Skonto, ASK Rīga and VEF Rīga. Since 2007, he was player-manager for VEF Rīga but at the 2010–2011 season was promoted to assistant coach. On December 17, 2015, Gailītis took over the head coaching duties, after Carlos Frade was fired. With Gailītis at the helm, VEF has won five Latvian championships and reached VTB United League quarterfinals twice.

National teams
In 2011 and 2013, he was the assistant coach for Latvian U16 team. In 2014, Gailītis was the head coach for Latvian U16 team, which won a silver medal at the FIBA Europe U16 Championship. In 2015, he was the head coach for Latvian U18 team. Since 2021, Gailītis is an assistant coach for Luca Banchi in the Men's National Team.

Honors and awards

Club career
 BK VEF Rīga 
5x  Latvian Basketball League Gold: (2017, 2019, 2020, 2021, 2022) 
1x  Latvian-Estonian Basketball League Gold: (2022) 
1x  Latvian Cup: (2022) 
2x  Latvian-Estonian Basketball League Silver: (2019, 2021)
2x  Latvian Basketball League Silver: (2016, 2018)

National Team
 FIBA Europe U-16 Championship Runner Up: (2014)

References

1985 births
Living people
Latvian basketball coaches
Latvian men's basketball players
Basketball players from Riga